On the Reliability of the Old Testament (William B. Eerdmans Publishing Company, Grand Rapids and Cambridge,) is a book by British Egyptologist Kenneth Kitchen (1932-). The book provides the reader with "the most sweeping scholarly case in a generation for the traditional beliefs held by Orthodox Jews and Christian conservatives", according to Richard Ostling. The book was intended to serve as a counterpart to F.F. Bruce's Are the New Testament Documents Reliable? (1943), and in so doing to counter the arguments of Biblical minimalism, which casts doubt upon the historical value of the Old Testament.

The book opens with an introductory chapter surveying the history with which it intends to deal, the continuous narrative in the Hebrew Bible from the Genesis creation narrative to the return of the Jews to Jerusalem from the Babylonian captivity in the early days of the Persian Empire in the 5th century BC.  The author claims that this history was written at the same time as the events it describes in its various sections, and that this can be confirmed by comparing the Old Testament with non-Biblical sources, both written and archaeological.  He clarifies by stating that there are three elements he means to address, history, literature and culture,  and three he does not, theology, doctrine, and dogma.

The core of the book is eight chapters (chapters 2 to 9) surveying Biblical history and comparing it to the ages with which it deals, from the 3rd millennium (the period to which Kitchen traces the origins of the Biblical stories of Noah's Flood and other incidents from the opening chapters of Genesis) to the Babylonian captivity and the return of the Jews to Jerusalem under the leadership of Ezra and Nehemiah.  The author presents his conclusions in chapter 10.

In chapter 10, despite supporting the historicity of the Bible, Kitchen also criticizes biblical archaeology as it was conceived in the first half of the 20th century, particularly the works of William Foxwell Albright and Cyrus Herzl Gordon, whom he dismisses as "little local (and very parochial)" representatives of the "long-deceased American Biblical Archaeology/theology school".

See also
The Making of the Pentateuch

Notes

External links 
at amazon.com

2003 non-fiction books
Biblical criticism